Jay's may refer to

 Jays Foods, snack food manufacturer
 Jay's Ltd., mourning warehouse
 Mrs. Jay's, restaurant